Eden Amplification (previously known as Eden Electronics) began as an American bass amplification company in 1976. The company takes its name from Eden Prairie, Minnesota, where the idea for the company was conceived. Eden designs and manufactures high-end bass amplification systems. This includes bass amplifiers, pre-amplifiers, power amps, bass pedals, and bass cabinets. Its most famous series of products include World Tour Amplifiers and D-series Cabinets. Eden's reputation was founded on the fact that everything was designed and built "in-house", including the speakers (a very rare feat by any manufacturer).  

Eden amplifiers are used by a variety of musicians but are primarily favored by those people who are defined as "player's players" including many session musicians and technical recording artists. Notable recording artists include bass players Mike Rutherford from the progressive rock band Genesis and the 1980s soft rock group Mike and the Mechanics, Phil Lesh formerly of the Grateful Dead, and Mike Gordon of Phish. Users of Eden equipment span a wide variety of musical style from jazz and country to heavy rock.

History

Eden was founded in 1976 in Montrose, Minnesota, 35 miles west of downtown Minneapolis. Originally, Eden designed and manufactured sound-reinforcement (public address) systems, in particular speaker cabinets and then drivers, whose popularity grew amongst sound engineers and with musicians.

After a short initial period building such specialist equipment, the company realized the popularity that their cabinet products were gaining with bass players. The company was also involved in a side project, designed a new type of cabinet for  SWR, to be called the Goliath cabinet.

Eden and its amplifier design also developed in parallel to its expanding cabinet business and moved from sound reenforcement to specialize in the bass sector of the music market. Maintaining a position that good bass amplification should deliver clear and un-coloured tone with a lot of headroom, the Eden World Tour product line eventually emerged.

Eden has undergone many changes including moving its production from Minnesota to Chicago when Eden became part of U.S. Music Corporation in 2003. This change also allowed the brand to increase the resources available to develop more products and enter into production of amplifiers and combos for less experienced players. In 2010, Brand Director Joe Delaney designed and introduced Eden's first foot pedal, the WTDI. Based on the World Tour Series preamp circuit, it quickly became the number one selling product. In December 2011, Eden left U.S. Music Corporation and became part of the Marshall Amplification family. Following this move, Eden became much more widely available around the world, primarily due to its improved distributor network.

2012–present

Eden Amplification became part of Marshall Amplification PLC in December 2011, and subsequently their headquarters moved to the Marshall Amplification factory in Bletchley, UK. This acquisition allowed Eden products to be distributed through Marshall Amplification's global distribution network, increasing the availability and visibility of Eden products in Europe and Asia.

A new flagship line of amplifiers was released in 2015 to replace the World Tour series, called the World Tour Pro range. This was followed in 2016 by the lightweight Terra Nova range. The line of bass effects pedals has also expanded, all based on the chassis design of the WTDI pedal. The first-ever battery-powered combo specifically for bass launched in 2014, called the MicroTour. In 2016, Eden applied their high-fidelity philosophy to produce a ukulele combo, the E-Uke.

In Summer 2016, production of D-Series cabinets was moved to the Marshall Amplification facility in Bletchley. The speakers are still manufactured to Eden's specifications by Eminence Speaker in Kentucky.

On March 10, 2021, Marshall sold Eden and related assets to Gear4music (Holdings) plc for £140,000 (£100,000 of which was deferred)..  As of May 2022, its website lists six distributors, located in the United Kingdom, Germany, Sweden, India, Oceania, and Argentina.

Products

Nemesis Series, 2001–2011

By 2000, Eden had become known as a high-quality, hi-fidelity, high power, high-price manufacturer of professional grade equipment.  In 1995, Eden introduced its Nemesis series of amplifiers, cabinets, and combos at significantly lower pricing, lower power, and lower power handling than the World Tour amps and D-Series cabinets. This brought the clarity of the "Eden sound" into the budget range of many weekend warriors and semi-professionals. Up until the introduction of the Nemesis line, all the Eden amps and cabinets were made in the United States.  The Nemesis line was manufactured in China.  They continued the Eden tradition of one-piece aluminum chassis construction for extra durability and toughness.

The Nemesis series amps were different from the World Tour series of amps in that they had an entirely FET solid state pre-amp as well as amplifier and one semi-parametric EQ control along with the standard bass, mid, and treble shelving controls.  Most of the Eden WT series used a hybrid pre-amp with both tube and solid-state components and a solid-state amplifier.   There were three completely solid-state WT amps (WT330, WT390, and WT405) that used a "Golden Ear" chip to get the warmth found in the hybrid World Tours.  The Nemesis did not have that chip.

The Nemesis amps still achieved the same clarity of sound that their much more expensive World Tour series did but, lacking the tube or the Golden Ear chip in the pre-amp circuitry, did not have the warmth of the World Tour series.  The new Nemesis amps used a blue face instead of the well-known gold face of the WT series and were known as the NA series (Nemesis Amp) in both heads and combos. They were very articulate amplifiers and became popular with the "touch bass" crowd, which needed the articulation more than the warmth, as well as a lot of rock bands, which also did not miss the warmth but needed the clarity.

The Nemesis series cabs were different than any cabs made before as they were constructed from a cellulose composite material and were lighter than the D-series cabinets.  They also had lower power handling capabilities.  They were sonically designed for use with the Nemesis amps and were also offered in a wide range of combos. Although they were still manufactured and sold, the Nemesis line did not appear in the Eden catalog again until 2005 when some changes were made to the EQ section of the Nemesis line.

2007 heralded the introduction of the Nemesis RS series combos, which offered Edge control to add tube-style grit (noticeable at high gain/high volumes), pre-/post-EQ selector for the DI output, footswitch for enhance bypass and mute functions, and changed the cabinets back to void-free plywood construction from the cellulose composite material.  The following year (2008) the RS-series heads became available separately as the RS-400 (400 watts at 4 ohms) and the RS-700 (700 watts at 2 ohms).  This Nemesis RS series was specifically designed "with rock bassist firmly in mind...to address the needs of players who want an aggressive, mix-cutting sound."  They all featured a black face with a large, blue, backlit Nemesis logo across the top of the amp face.  2007 was also the last year the blue-faced Nemesis NA amplifiers were sold.

The Nemesis Silver series was also introduced in 2007 with the serious younger player in mind. In 2008 they became the N series with a black face instead of a silver face.  These were smaller lower-powered combos and since they included an auxiliary input for either RCA jacks or standard 1/4" jack, a player could plug two basses in at once.  Besides the targeted market of those just getting into bass playing, they quickly became favorites of instructors who needed to plug two basses into one amp that did not shake the store down, and also earned a spot as a "leave at home" practice amp with simplified tone controls for semi-pro and professionals alike.  This series eventually evolved into the e-series amp and combos currently offered (2014).

In 2009, the RS series went through a cosmetic make-over and were re-labeled as the EN (Eden Nemesis) series.  (All electronics and capabilities stayed the same as the RS series.)  The XST version of Nemesis cabs were first introduced this year as all the Nemesis cabs were also renamed from RS to EN.  This was the last year of the Nemesis series under the Nemesis name.

In 2010, the Nemesis line morphed one final time.  Under ownership of USM after the founder had departed, the decision was made to pull the Nemesis EN amplifiers into the newer Black-Faced WTB series.  At the time the only other WTB amp was the WTB1000, which was basically a WT800 with selectable 8-band graphic EQ and one semi-parabolic control.  The only similarity between the WTB1000 and the WTB400 and WTB700 was the single semi-parabolic control that could be turned on or off.  Otherwise they were entirely different pre-amp and power sections.

In 2010, the Nemesis cabs changed from being the EN series into two distinctly different series – the EX series replaced the previous EN series and the E-xxxXST series replaced the ENxxxXST series, marking the end of the Nemesis cabinets.

From 2001 through 2010 the Nemesis series offered an imported solution to great sound at a lower power and price than the top-of-the-line Eden offerings.  Other Eden offerings  have taken their place, but the Nemesis series itself disappeared in 2010.

References

External links
Eden Amplification Official Website
Eden Amplification Forum
Eden WTDI Preamp Product Review

Audio equipment manufacturers of the United States
Guitar amplifier manufacturers
Companies based in Lake County, Illinois
Buffalo Grove, Illinois
JAM Industries